Love Bites may refer to:

 Love-bite or hickey, a small bruise caused by kissing, sucking, or biting the skin

Film and television
 Love Bites (TV series), a 2011 drama starring Becki Newton
 Love Bites (film), a 1993 comedy starring Adam Ant
 Love Bites (Les Morsures de l'aube), a 2001 French thriller starring Guillaume Canet and Asia Argento
 Lovebites, a 2006 American adaptation of the Québécois TV sitcom Un gars, une fille
 Love Bites, a series of Valentine's Day-themed shorts from Happy Tree Friends

Music
 Love Bites (band), a UK group
 Lovebites (band), a Japanese heavy metal group
 Love Bites (album), a 1978 album by Buzzcocks
Love Bites (EP), by The Midnight Beast

Songs
 "Love Bites" (Def Leppard song)
 "Love Bites" (Grace Jones song)
 "Love Bites" a song by Judas Priest from Defenders of the Faith
 "Love Bites (So Do I)", a 2012 song by Halestorm

Other uses 
 Love Bites, a novel in the Vampire Kisses series by Ellen Schreiber

See also 
 "Love-Bheits", an episode of the TV series The Venture Bros
Love Bytes, an Australian TV anthology series
Lovebytes, a digital arts organisation based in Sheffield, UK